Enorma Jean is the stage name of Davide Gatto, a drag performer most known for competing on Drag Race Italia. In episode 4, Enorma and Ava Hangar were made to lip sync for the chance to stay in the competition as punishment for swearing at and insulting production staff. Enorma lost the lip sync and was thus disqualified.

Filmography

Television
 Drag Race Italia (2021)

References

Year of birth missing (living people)
Living people
Drag Race Italia contestants
Italian drag queens
Italian television personalities